15th Anniversary Celebration is a live album by the progressive bluegrass Maryland band The Seldom Scene. This was the last album  for bassist Tom Gray, who left to pursue his own music and was replaced by T. Michael Coleman.

Track listing

Personnel
 Lou Reid – vocals, guitar
 John Duffey – mandolin, vocals
 Ben Eldridge – banjo, guitar, vocals
 Mike Auldridge – Dobro, guitar, vocals
 Tom Gray – bass, vocals

with
 John Starling – vocals, guitar
 Ricky Skaggs – violin, mandolin
 Paul Craft – guitar, vocals
 Stuart Duncan – violin
 Jonathan Edwards – guitar, vocals
 Emmylou Harris – guitar, vocals
 Bobby Hicks – violin
 Alan O'Bryant – banjo
 Lou Reid – violin, guitar, bass
 Tony Rice – guitar, vocals
 Linda Ronstadt -vocals
 Charlie Waller – guitar, vocals
 Sharon White
 Robbie Magruder – drums

References

External links
 Official site

The Seldom Scene live albums
1986 live albums
Sugar Hill Records live albums